Susan Elizabeth Field (born 10 May 1959) is an English Anglican priest who served as Archdeacon Pastor (and Archdeacon of Coventry) in the Diocese of Coventry from 18 March 2018 until her resignation in January 2023.

Field was educated at King Edward VI High School for Girls, Birmingham and the University of York. She taught maths at Queensbridge School for three years. She studied for the priesthood at Queen's College, Birmingham. She was ordained deacon in 1987; and priest in 1994. After a curacy in Coleshill, Warwickshire she was the Chaplain at Loughborough University from 1991 to 1998. She was Team Vicar of Loughborough from 1998 until 2014; and Vicar of Nanpantan from 2014 until her appointment as Archdeacon Pastor. During her time in Loughborough, she also held other senior leadership posts. On 4 January 2023, Field was required to resign her offices as the result of a Clergy Discipline Measure proceeding for serious misconduct ("Conduct unbecoming & inappropriate to the office and work of a clerk in Holy Orders"). An injunction was also taken out against her.

References

Archdeacons of Coventry
1959 births
People from Birmingham, West Midlands
People educated at King Edward VI High School for Girls, Birmingham
Living people
Alumni of the Queen's Foundation
Alumni of the University of York
20th-century English Anglican priests
21st-century English Anglican priests